Dhani Dulat is a village of district Fatehabad, Haryana, India.

Location 

It is near Bhuna in the district Fatehabad, Haryana in the country India.

Bhuna 

There are 32 inhabited villages in the block.  Bhuna has a good mandi and a sugar mill has since started functioning.  Cotton, wheat and sugar cane are major crops grown in this block.

See also
 List of villages in Fatehabad district

References

External links
 Official Website of Fatehabad

Villages in Fatehabad district